Valeriu Lazarov or Valerio Lazarov (born December 20, 1935, Bârlad, Romania – died August 11, 2009, Tres Cantos, Spain) was a Romanian-born television producer and director of several tv channels from Romania, Spain and Italy.

He defected to Spain in 1968, and was hired the same year by Juan José Rosón to work for RTVE. He became a Spanish citizen in 1972.

He was married seven times: twice in Romania before he defected to Spain in 1968, then in 1970, in Miami, to Cuban singer Elsa Baeza (with whom he has a son; they divorced in 1973), in 1978 to American actress Didi Sherman (they divorced in 1983), with whom he had two children, in 1989 to Italian Adonella Azzoni (divorced in 1996), with whom he has two children, to Sonia Costa (between 2001 and 2002), and in 2004, in Madrid, to Romanian Augusta Dumitraşcu, who is about 40 years his junior.

References

External links
Romanian TV Producer Valeriu Lazarov Dies At 73

Spanish television producers
Spanish people of Romanian descent
Romanian emigrants to Spain
People from Madrid
People from Bârlad
Romanian defectors
Romanian expatriates in Spain
1935 births
2009 deaths